Mesopeplum is a genus of scallops, marine bivalve molluscs in the family Pectinidae.

Species in the genus Mesopeplum 
 Mesopeplum caroli
 Mesopeplum convexum (Quoy and Gaimard, 1835)  
 Mesopeplum fenestratum     
 Mesopeplum crawfordi †

References
 Powell A. W. B., New Zealand Mollusca, William Collins Publishers Ltd, Auckland, New Zealand, (1979), 
 DiscoverLife

Pectinidae
Bivalves of Australia
Bivalves of New Zealand
Bivalve genera